LMS diesel shunter 7054 was initially allocated the number 7404 but this number was never carried.  It was supplied by the Hunslet Engine Company in 1934.  Testing started in October 1934 and it was taken into LMS stock in November 1934.

War Department use
The locomotive was loaned to the War Department for various periods of time during 1939–1942, which numbered it 26. It was withdrawn from LMS stock in May 1943 and sold to the War Department, which then numbered it 225 (70225 from 1944).

Post-war use
In 1947, it was sold to Hunslet, where it was stored for seven years before being hired to the National Coal Board. The NCB later bought the locomotive and had it rebuilt with a Rolls-Royce C6NFL engine by Hunslet in 1960–61. It worked at a number of collieries for the NCB, but was finally withdrawn and scrapped in 1974.

See also
 LMS diesel shunters

References

7054
Diesel shunter 7054
War Department locomotives
Hunslet locomotives
C locomotives
Railway locomotives introduced in 1934
Standard gauge locomotives of Great Britain
Scrapped locomotives